The 2021 Swiss Mixed Doubles Curling Championship was held from January 27 to 30, 2021 at the Curlinghalle AG Biel in Biel, Switzerland. The winning pair of Briar Hürlimann and Yannick Schwaller then played against the 2020 Swiss champions Jenny Perret and Martin Rios for the right represent Switzerland at the 2021 World Mixed Doubles Curling Championship.

The event was held in a round robin format between the eight competing teams. The top three teams then advanced to the playoffs where the second place team played the third place team in the semifinal. The winner of the semifinal then played the first place team in a best of three to determine the winner.

Teams
The teams are listed as follows:

Round robin standings 
Final Round Robin Standings

Round robin results
All draw times are listed in Central European Time (UTC+01:00).

Draw 1
Wednesday, January 27, 7:00 pm

Draw 2
Thursday, January 28, 9:00 am

Draw 3
Thursday, January 28, 2:00 pm

Draw 4
Thursday, January 28, 7:00 pm

Draw 5
Friday, January 29, 9:00 am

Draw 6
Friday, January 29, 2:00 pm

Draw 7
Friday, January 29, 7:00 pm

Semifinal
Saturday, January 30, 9:00 am

Championship Round

Game 1
Saturday, January 30, 2:00 pm

Game 2
Saturday, January 30, 7:00 pm

References

External links

Curling competitions in Switzerland
Biel/Bienne
2021 in curling
Sport in the Canton of Bern
January 2021 sports events in Europe
2021 in Swiss sport